Johnny Bredahl Johansen (born 27 August 1968), known professionally as Johnny Bredahl or Johny Wahid Johansen, is a Danish former professional boxer who competed between 1989 and 2006. He is a world champion in two weight classes, having held the WBO super-flyweight title from 1992 to 1994 and the WBA bantamweight title between 2002 and 2004. He is the younger brother of former super featherweight world champion of boxing, Jimmi Bredahl.

Amateur career
Bredahl boxed as an amateur and represented Denmark in the 1988 Summer Olympics in Seoul, South Korea before turning professional.

1988 Olympic results
Below is the record of Johnny Bedahl, a Danish flyweight boxer who competed at the 1988 Seoul Olympics:

 Round of 64: lost to Hamed Halbouni (Syria) referee stopped contest in the second round

Professional career
In December 1988, Bredahl turn professional winning his first fight at the Sheraton Hotel in Copenhagen, when Bredahl beat England's Gordon Stobie with a points decision over six rounds. Bredahl won seven of his first eight fights in a similar fashion.

Bredahl won the vacant EBU bantamweight title, in March 1992 with a seven-round knockout win over Scotland's Donnie Hood. Later that year, Bredahl won his first world title belt, the WBO super-flyweight title with a win over Jose Quirino.

Bredahl first opportunity to fight for a recognised world title belt came in December 1995, when he challenged Wayne McCullough for his WBC bantamweight title. However, Bredahl suffered the first defeat on his career when McCullough beat Bredahl by a knockout in the seventh round to retain his title.

Bredahl also won minor world titles from the IBO, WBU, and IBC.

In April 2002, he once again became a world champion by beating Eidy Moya to win the WBA bantamweight title. He went on to successfully defend the title 3 times and announced his retirement in October 2004.

Bredahl briefly came back and fought Alexander Fedorov. However, he immediately went back to retirement after the fight.

Professional boxing record

See also
List of super-flyweight boxing champions
List of bantamweight boxing champions
List of Danish world boxing champions

References

External links
 

1968 births
Living people
Olympic boxers of Denmark
Boxers at the 1988 Summer Olympics
Super-flyweight boxers
Bantamweight boxers
World super-flyweight boxing champions
World bantamweight boxing champions
World Boxing Organization champions
World Boxing Association champions
International Boxing Organization champions
Sportspeople from Copenhagen
Danish male boxers